Events from the year 1633 in Denmark.

Incumbents 
 Monarch – Christian IV

Events

Births

Full date missing
 Jacob Jensen Jersin, theologian (died 1694)

Deaths 
 14 June – Christian, Duke of Schleswig-Holstein-Sonderburg-Ærø, first and only Duke of Ærø (born 1570)
 12 August – Ulrik of Denmark, prince (born 1611)

References 

 
Denmark
Years of the 17th century in Denmark